Pakka is a 2018 Tamil language romantic comedy film directed by debutant S. S. Surya. Produced by Benn Consortium Studios (P) Ltd, starring Vikram Prabhu in dual role alongside Nikki Galrani and Bindu Madhavi. Production for the film began in February 2017. The movie was released on April 27, 2018. It received  mixed reviews from both critics and audience and was considered as a "Disaster" at the box office.

Plot 
Nadhiya (Bindhu Madhavi) who is trying to commit suicide on a railway track, but our hero Dhoni Kumar (Vikram Prabhu) comes to her rescue. Nadhiya mistakes Kumar for Pandi (also Vikram Prabhu) a toy-seller from the village. In a flashback it is revealed that Nadhiya, the village chief's daughter, had fallen for Pandi seeing his inherent goodness but due to parental opposition, the lovers get separated. Nadhiya runs away from her house in search of Pandi and meets up with Dhoni Kumar, who is a spitting image of Pandi. Dhoni Kumar is a carefree guy who is a crazy fan of Mahendra Singh Dhoni and he is in love with Rajini Radha (Nikki Galrani), the president of a Superstar Rajinikanth fan club. Hearing the sad story of Nadhiya, Dhoni Kumar promises that he will find her lover Pandi.

Cast

Soundtrack

The Soundtrack was composed by C. Sathya and Released by Lahari Music.

Production 
In November 2016, it was reported that Vikram Prabhu had agreed terms to work on a film titled Pakka directed by newcomer Surya. Nikki Galrani signed on to play the leading female role in January 2017, and worked on the film alongside her commitments in Neruppu Da (2017), which also featured her alongside Vikram Prabhu. The project became Nikki Galrani's 25th film, and the director revealed that she would portray a Rajinikanth fan. Director Surya revealed Pakka would be a "complete commercial entertainer which is set against a rural backdrop", and also confirmed that the team had signed on actors Soori, Sathish and Anandaraj for supporting roles.

The team began the shoot on 1 February 2017 in Courtallam, undertaking a schedule for twenty days. Other than this film is produced by   T.Sivakumar and Coproduced by P.B.Saravanan

References

External links
 

Indian romantic comedy films
2018 romantic comedy films
2018 films
2018 masala films
2010s Tamil-language films
Films scored by C. Sathya
2018 directorial debut films